Kukuryki  is a village in the administrative district of Gmina Terespol, within Biała Podlaska County, Lublin Voivodeship, in eastern Poland, close to the border with Belarus.

The village has a population of 52.

A major road border crossing on Poland's National Road DK68 into Belarus is located at the village. Kazłovičy is located across the border. This crossing is an alternative to the Terespol-Brest crossing further south. Kukuryki is expected to be the eastern terminus of the planned extension of Poland's A2 motorway, which will connect with the Belarusian  motorway across the border in Kazłovičy, north of Brest.

References

Villages in Biała Podlaska County
Belarus–Poland border crossings